Shuar, which literally means "people", also known by such (now derogatory) terms as Chiwaro, Jibaro, Jivaro, or Xivaro, is an indigenous language spoken by the Shuar people of Morona Santiago Province and Pastaza Province in the Ecuadorian Amazon basin.

History 
Twelve Indigenous languages of Ecuador are spoken today, one of which is Shuar. For the past four decades, the Shuar language has been noted for its link with several political groups.

The name “Shuar” shared among the people and their language was first revealed to the Spaniards in the 17th century. The Shuar language, as it stands today, is considered part of the Jivaroan language tree, and embodies one of the most well-known tribal groups in the Amazonian jungle region.

Radio schools 
The geographical remoteness within the Ecuadorian rainforest isolates the Shuar and has widely scattered the people from one another. As a result, in the late 1960s, radio schools were formed to promote communication and education in both Spanish and Shuar. This inadvertently transformed into a language revitalization initiative for the Shuar people. Radio schools were shut down in 2001 and replaced with formal bilingual in-class teaching.

Phonology

Consonants

Vowels/Nasals

Literature
The Constitution of Ecuador has been translated in its entirety into the Shuar language.

Sample text
The following text is an official translation of part of Article 2 of the Constitution of Ecuador which stipulates the language policy of the State.

 

Translation in English: "Article 2.- ... Spanish is Ecuador's official language; Spanish, Kichwa and Shuar are official languages for intercultural ties. The other ancestral languages are in official use by indigenous peoples in the areas where they live and in accordance with the terms set forth by law. The State shall respect and encourage their preservation and use."

References

 Turner, Glen D. (1958): "Alternative phonemicizing in Jivaro", in International Journal of American Linguistics 24, 2, pp. 87–94.

External links
 
 
 Shuar Language Guide
 The Bible in Shuar

Chicham languages
Languages of Ecuador